John Rothwell (born 1951 in Blackrock, County Cork) is an Irish former sportsperson. He played hurling with his local club Blackrock and was a member of the Cork minor, under-21 and senior inter-county teams in the late 1960s and early 1970s.

References

1951 births
Living people
Blackrock National Hurling Club hurlers
Cork inter-county hurlers